Beautiful Hum is the debut studio album by Australian rock band Small Mercies, released through Sony BMG on 24 May 2008.

Singles
Small Mercies released three singles from the album. The first being "Innocent", which was released nearly a full year before the album in June 2007. The song was nominated for the ARIA award for Breakthrough Artist – Single in 2007. "Innocent" reached No. 38 on the ARIA Charts and stayed in the top fifty for nine weeks. It also appeared on the Channel 7 television advertisement for Prison Break. The second single "Sorry", was released on 6 October 2007, and reached No. 54 on the ARIA Charts. "Don't You Know Who I Am?" was released to wide radio airplay and as a digital single on 12 April 2008, it was also on a television advertisement for the Australian TV series, Gladiators.

Track listing
 "Come On" – 3:29
 "Sorry" – 4:19
 "Innocent" – 4:21
 "Almost Perfect" – 3:40 
 "Stand on the Outside" – 3:40 
 "Beautiful Hum" – 3:43
 "The Trouble with You and Me" – 3:51 
 "Don't You Know Who I Am?" – 3:56
 "Feels Like Fire" – 3:52
 "Save Me" – 3:46
 "Where Were You When the World Stopped Turning?" – 4:02
 "Hang On" (Australian iTunes bonus track)

Charts

References

2008 debut albums